In road design, a slip lane, also known as a filter lane in the United Kingdom, is a road at a junction that allows motorists to change roads without actually entering an intersection. 

Some intersections that are controlled by lights offer a slip lane, which allows cars to bypass the lights when they turn. That helps ease congestion and improves journey times, as people turning do not have to stop at the light but can continue at the same speed. There are two types of slip lanes at intersections: slip lanes that end and require traffic to merge to join the main road, and slip roads that continue onto the main road as another traffic lane.

Rules
In Australia, before entering a slip road, drivers must look to ensure that their blind spots are clear of other motorists, cyclists, and pedestrians. Drivers must then give way to any pedestrians crossing the slip road. Before joining the main road from a slip road, drivers must give way to all other traffic even if it is faced with a give-way or with other traffic controls.

Pedestrians
In countries such as the United Kingdom in which partial conflicts between pedestrians and vehicular traffic are not permitted, slip lanes can be used as part of a "walk with traffic" facility. Normally, pedestrian signals in the UK operate on a full pedestrian stage in which all traffic is held at red, and all pedestrian crossings are given a green signal. With a slip lane, pedestrians can cross to the triangular island during the vehicle red phase and cross the road while the traffic from their approach has a green.

Dangers
The organisation Strong Towns argues that slip lanes exist to only prioritise the speed of motor traffic and calls for the removal of slip lanes on local streets.

When poorly designed, slip lanes can be a dangerous design element. For reasons of urban design and pedestrian safety, many road-controlling authorities are actively removing them in urban and suburban settings. Slip lanes may need to be removed if considerations such as pedestrian safety grow to a point that they override the desire to facilitate free passage for cars.

To minimise risks of collision, slip lanes can be shaped to enter the traffic flow at an angle higher than the 45 degrees that is shown in the sketch. Such lanes are called high-entry angle slip lanes.

See also
 Interchange
 Advanced stop line
 Continuous-flow intersection
 Hook turn
 Quadrant roadway intersection
 Seagull intersection
 Superstreet
 Texas T
 Texas U-turn
 Turnaround

References

Road junction types

de:Ausfahrkeil